David Lester is the guitar player in the Vancouver, Canada based band Mecca Normal, as well as a painter, graphic designer and publisher at Get to the Point Press. Mecca Normal's lyrics are written and performed by Jean Smith, who explores themes of social injustice, feminism and anti-authoritarianism.

Lester met Mecca Normal bandmate Smith in 1981 while the two were working together at a Vancouver newspaper. As a result of their collaboration, Mecca Normal is considered a forerunner and an inspiration to the 1990s politically charged riot grrrl and D-I-Y movements.

In August 1993, Lester started Get to the Point Press to publish Smith's first novel I Can Hear Me Fine. He subsequently published chapbooks of graphic design and poetry by community activists including Keys to Kingdoms by Bud Osborn which, in 1999, won the City of Vancouver Book Award. In 2002, Get to the Point published Smith's chapbook The Family Swan and Other Songs followed by Smith's Two Stories in 2006.

In 2005, Arbeiter Ring published Lester's book The Gruesome Acts of Capitalism—a compendium of creatively juxtaposed statistics that illuminate issues of poverty. Royalties from the book go to The Canadian Centre for Victims of Torture. The book went to a second, revised printing in 2007. In 2010 the book was required reading in the Studies in Contemporary Literature course at Capilano University (British Columbia).

Since 2002, Lester and Smith have been co-presenting an art exhibit, lecture and performance event called How Art & Music Can Change the World in rock venues, youth centres, art galleries and classrooms, including Willamette University, California Institute of the Arts, NEXUS/foundation for today's art, Mount Holyoke College, the Rhode Island School of Design, and Evergreen State College.

Mecca Normal's albums have been released on K Records, Matador Records, Kill Rock Stars and the band's own Smarten Up! Records—created in 1986 to release their first LP.

In 2007, Mecca Normal was named one of 10 famous Canadians you’ve never heard of by Canada's national newspaper, The Globe & Mail.

Lester has also collaborated with experimental bassist Wendy Atkinson to form the duo Horde of Two. They released their debut CD Guitar & Bass Actions on Smarten Up! & Get To The Point Records in 2009.

Since mid-2009, David Lester has been illustrating a weekly feature for Magnet Magazine online, with text by Jean Smith. Ostensibly the feature visually documents people, places and events from Mecca Normal’s 26-year history, but it often veers into wider territory.

In 2010, David Lester’s poster series Inspired Agitators became part of the permanent collection of the Center For The Study of Political Graphics in Los Angeles.

In 2010, Mecca Normal recorded a single for K Records. In May 2010, Mecca Normal organized a group art exhibit called The Black Dot Museum: Political Artists from Vancouver, which took place in Olympia, WA at the Northern Gallery.

Lester's second book, a 312 page graphic novel called The Listener, was published by Arbeiter Ring in the spring of 2011.

The Listener was nominated for ForeWord Reviews' 2011 Book Of The Year Award in the graphic novel category.

In 2014, David Lester's poster, Malachi (18 x 28″) was included in the 2014 Whitney Biennial at the Whitney Museum of American Art in New York City as part of the exhibit Public Collectors: Malachi Ritscher. The exhibit also included a recording of a live set performed by Mecca Normal, and both sides of the cover of the Mecca Normal 7″ record that includes the song Malachi about war protester Malachi Ritscher.

Lester's rock duo Mecca Normal released their 13th album, Empathy for the Evil (M'lady's Records) in late 2014. It was produced, mixed and mastered by Kramer. Most of the songs are directly out of two of Jean Smith's unpublished novels. The album was recorded by Rat Bastard in 2012 at the Laundry Room in Miami Beach, Florida.

In 2016, Mecca Normal‘s song Man Thinks Woman (1987) is included in Pitchfork‘s "The Story of Feminist Punk in 33 Songs: From Patti Smith to Bikini Kill, the songs that have crushed stereotypes and steered progress".

Mecca Normal open for The Julie Ruin on their 2016 Pacific Northwest tour.

In 2017, the comics anthology Drawn To Change: Graphic Histories of Working Class Struggle (which includes David Lester’s The Battle of Ballantyne Pier) wins the $10,000 Wilson Prize for the best book that "succeeds in making Canadian historical scholarship accessible to a wide and transnational audience" The book also wins the Canadian Historical Association’s Public History Prize.

In 2017, the book Challenging Stories: Canadian Literature for Social Justice in the Classroom (Canadian Scholars’ Press) features a chapter on teaching David Lester’s graphic novel The Listener to high school students. The chapter by Karen Jacobson demonstrates innovative ways of how The Listener was used to teach social justice issues to secondary school classes, stating "From the very first page, the book inspired thoughtful discussion about the place of social action in the students’ own lives."

In 2019, Lester illustrates the graphic novel 1919: A Graphic History of the Winnipeg General Strike (Between The Lines Books), written by The Graphic History Collective. The book is published in German (Bahoe Books) and French (Between The Lines) editions.

Also in 2019, Lester illustrates a 12-page chapter in Direct Action Gets The Goods: A Graphic History of the Strike in Canada by The Graphic History Collective (Between The Lines).

Mecca Normal releases Mecca Normal live in Montreal, 1996 on Artoffact Records in 2019 as part of CBC’s Brave New Waves series. The live recording includes Peter Jefferies on drums.

Lester creates a 5 x 3’ mural for a 2019 permanent exhibit called Coal, Conflict and Community at Cumberland Museum & Archives depicting significant figures in the areas political and social history.

The New York Times in 2019, lists Mecca Normal‘s I Walk Alone as an essential song in their article, Riot Grrrl United Feminism and Punk. An Essential Listening Guide. 25 songs that fueled a rock revolution.

Better Things written and starring Pamela Adlon on the FX channel includes 
Mecca Normal’s song I Walk Alone in three different scenes in episode 2 of season 3 (2019), with a viewership of 353,000.

1919: A Graphic History of the Winnipeg Strike is shortlisted for the George Ryga Award for Social Awareness in Literature in 2020.

In a 2020 Rolling Stone magazine feature on Riot Grrrl, Mecca Normal’s I Walk Alone is included on a playlist of 23 songs.

References

External links
 Mecca Normal Home Page
 Visual Resistance David Lester Profile Page (archived)
 Weekly Volcano

Living people
Canadian rock guitarists
Canadian male guitarists
Male feminists
Feminist musicians
Year of birth missing (living people)